Tentacles is a 2009 young adult science fiction novel by Roland Smith and the sequel to Cryptid Hunters. School Library Journal describes it as "a high-octane page-turner".

Plot
Tentacles begins as the protagonists from Cryptid Hunters board the Coelacanth, a presumably haunted ship, on a voyage led by Dr. Wolfe to capture a giant squid alive. During the voyage, there are Mokele-mbembe eggs (which Marty and Grace had found in the Congo in Cryptid Hunters) incubating in a laboratory restricted to most of the crew. Unbeknownst to Wolfe, Blackwood's thug, Butch is on board stealing the Mokele Mbembe eggs and Grace for his boss. The book culminates in a showdown/feud between Blackwood and Wolfe, ending in Ted Bronson, Wolfe's partner's, successful capture of a squid, though Blackwood, thinking Wolfe and the rest of the crew to be dead, escapes with the hatchlings, and Grace. Unbeknownst to Wolfe, Grace tricked Blackwood into taking her, with the dragonspy hidden on her, allowing her to be one step ahead of Blackwood.

Reading lists
 2010 - Montana State University Kids on Campus
 2010 - Donoho School Summer Reading List – Grade 8
 2010 - Doral Academy Charter School Incoming Fourth/Fifth Grade Student's Summer Reading List
 2010 - Holy Name of Jesus Fifth Grade Summer Reading List
 2010 - Jackson Middle School 7th Grade Language Arts/ Reading List
 2010 - Nauset Regional Middle School Summer Reading
 2010 - Pennington School Rising Sixth Grade Summer Reading List
 2010 - Roanoke County Public Schools Accelerated Reader Quiz List

Sequels
In September 2013 Roland Smith released the third Marty and Grace book, Chupacabra, and in September 2014, the fourth book, Mutation.

References

 Will there be a sequel to Cryptid Hunters and Tentacles? rolandsmith.com/blog
 February 11, 2011. Chupacabra continues. rolandsmith.com/blog

External links

 
 

2009 American novels
2009 science fiction novels
American science fiction novels
Children's science fiction novels
American young adult novels
Novels by Roland Smith